Give Us This Night is one of five movies produced by Paramount Pictures featuring Gladys Swarthout, a very popular Metropolitan Opera mezzo-soprano. The studio was attempting to build on the popularity of Grace Moore, another opera singer, who had also expanded her talents into movies.

Plot

After being introduced to the world of opera, a fisherman (Jan Kiepura) falls for a woman (Swarthout) whose guardian is a noted composer (Philip Merivale).  They met when the fisherman evaded the police by seeking refuge in the village church.  While there, they are each captivated by hearing the other singing Mass. The beautiful woman falls in love with the fisherman with the wonderful voice.

Production background
Scenes from the film were shot at Three Arch Bay near South Laguna, California.

See also
 Rose of the Rancho (1936)
 Champagne Waltz (1937)
 Romance in the Dark (1938)
 Ambush (1939)

References

External links

 Give Us This Night at SwarthoutFamily.org

1936 films
1936 musical films
American musical films
American black-and-white films
Films directed by Alexander Hall
Paramount Pictures films
1930s American films